The 2011 Oceania Handball Champions Cup was held in Tahiti from the 5 to 10 November 2011. This was organised by the Oceania Handball Federation and featured teams from Australia, New Zealand, New Caledonia and host's Tahiti.

The tournament was won by Australian team Sydney University. They won the right to represent Oceania in the 2012 IHF Super Globe.

Results

Round robin stage

Fifth Place play off

Third Place play off

Final

Final standings

External links
 OHBF results
 Planet Handball article
 AS Faa'a webpage (French)

Oceania Handball Champions Cup